Attanayake Mudiyanselage Kithsiri Senarath Bandara Attanayake (12 August 1966 – 29 August 2017) known as Senarath Attanayake was a Sri Lankan politician and lawyer. He was a recipient of the 2016 Henry Viscardi Achievement Award. He was also a member of the Uva Provincial Council, Sri Lanka and was the Minister of Agriculture, Irrigation, Livestock, Land and Forestry of the Uva Provincial Council from 2000 to 2005 as well as the acting Chief Minister for a brief period during this tenure. Attanayake is the first person with a disability in Sri Lanka to be an elected representative and a lawyer and the only person with a disability to hold a ministerial portfolio.

Early life and education
Born to Attanayake Mudiyanselage Jayawardena Attanayake a member of parliament (1970–1977 & 1994–1999), former Basnayaka Nilame (Lay Custodian) of the Ruhunu Maha Kataragama Devalaya and Wimala Manathunge of Pitakumbura, a village in the Moneragala District. The eldest in a family of three, with a brother and a sister, at the age of two years he was affected by Polio and is a wheelchair user since then. He was educated at the Royal College Colombo and graduated from University of Colombo and passed the law exams of the Sri Lanka Law College becoming an Attorney at law.

Career
Maintaining a successful legal career, Attanayake entered active politics in 1999, following the death of his father. He contested for the Uva Provincial Council Elections, winning a seat that he holds at present and served as a Minister in his first term. He never received any merits due to his disability and contested in the mainstream with his colleagues.

He represents Moneragala district – one of the most poverty-stricken and disadvantaged areas of Sri Lanka – and Senarath has been instrumental in finding alternate solutions to enhance the quality of life in the community. "Back to Earth" is one such enterprise, where natural refuse is converted into attractive eco-friendly gift items and mementos and sold at Colombo's lifestyle stores, bringing an additional revenue to the rural community.

Attanayake is also an activist for making all public places and building in Sri Lanka entirely accessible to wheelchair users. In 2006, he sued Qatar Airlines for misplacing his wheelchairs and donated the entire amount to Ragama Rehabilitation Hospital for building proper access for wheelchairs. He has been active in bringing the rights of the disabled Sri Lankans to the forefront. He is also pioneering a programme for disability counselling in Sri Lanka.

In 2012, Senarath prepared a set of proposals titled 'Making Moneragala the First Disable Friendly District of Sri Lanka', which he presented to the Uva Provincial Council and also to several organisations and donors. The Country Office of the World Health Organization (WHO) in Colombo took these proposals into consideration and recognising the similarities of the proposals with the Global Age-friendly Cities concept, pledged its support to the project with the altered theme 'Moneragala, the First Disable-friendly/Age-friendly District in Sri Lanka. Accordingly, the Wellawaya Division of Moneragala District was selected as a pilot division for the implementation of the project. This was the second city in southeast Asia to join the network and the first in Sri Lanka.

In December 2012, the Wellawaya Division of Moneragala District joined the Global Age-friendly Cities Network.
Senarath is presently co-ordinating the project (pro-bono) which involves DPOs, CBR Networks, WHO-SEARO, WHO-CO in Sri Lanka, Ministry of Social Services, Ministry of Health, Uva Provincial Council, other government administrative bodies and structures and the community of the division in general. He is also campaigning with donor agencies for more funding for the extended activities related to the project.

He represented Sri Lanka at the sixth, seventh, and eighth Conferences of State Parties to the United Nations Convention on the Rights of Persons with Disabilities and at the High Level Meeting on Disability and Development held at the United Nations Headquarters in New York on 23 September 2013. He won the Henry Viscardi Achievement Awards given to exemplary leaders with disabilities in 2016.

Senarath is an Adviser to the Export Development Board of Sri Lanka.

Personal life

Senarath is married to Lasanthi Daskon an Attorney-at-Law and a Disability Rights Activist and lives alternatively in Colombo and in Bibila, Sri Lanka. Senarath has one daughter Chetianga from his previous marriage to Shikanthini Varma.

Death
Senarath Attanayake died on 29 August 2017 at a private hospital, not quite a month after his 51st birthday.

See also
List of political families in Sri Lanka
List of physically disabled politicians
List of poliomyelitis survivors

References

External links
http://www.viscardicenter.org/recipients-of-the-2016-henry-viscardi-achievement-awards-announced/
http://www.ft.lk/?s=senarath+attanayake
http://www.backtoearth.lk
https://web.archive.org/web/20100309132318/http://www.smallbusiness.lk/
https://archive.today/20130412080422/http://www.ledderwerkstaetten.de/aktuelles/sri-lanka.html
http://www.wn.de/Muensterland/Kreis-Steinfurt/Tecklenburg/Besuch-aus-Sri-Lanka-Gaeste-finden-das-Niveau-unglaublich
http://www.whosrilanka.org/EN/Index.html
http://www.divaina.com/2014/06/15/feature06.html
http://www.polioplace.org/sites/default/files/files/AttanayakeS.pdf
http://mirrorcitizen.dailymirror.lk/2015/06/08/transforming-wellawaya-one-man-striving-to-make-a-difference/

1966 births
2017 deaths
Agriculture ministers of Sri Lankan provinces
Members of the Uva Provincial Council
Sinhalese lawyers
Sri Lankan Buddhists
Alumni of Royal College, Colombo
Alumni of the University of Colombo
People with polio
Members of the Uva Province Board of Ministers
Sinhalese politicians